30 vies  is a French-language Canadian television series directed by Fabienne Larouche, produced by Aetios Productions and broadcast between 10 January 2011 and 14 April 2016 on ICI Radio-Canada Télé, with 4 episodes per week.

Awards

References

External links 
 

2011 Canadian television series debuts
2016 Canadian television series endings
2010s Canadian drama television series
Ici Radio-Canada Télé original programming
CBC Television original programming
Television shows set in Quebec